Shiboprosad Mukherjee (born 20 May 1974) is an Indian film director, writer and actor. He, collaborating with Nandita Roy, debuted with their film Icche, which garnered both critical acclaim as well as commercial success. The director duo is known for making socially relevant films which are also entertaining to the viewers. They have also directed some of the popular most new age Bengali films like Praktan, Bela Seshe, Icche, Muktodhara, Accident, Alik Sukh and Ramdhanu, Haami, Konntho, Gotro which were critically acclaimed as well as enjoyed commercial success. He also serves as a partner at Windows Productions. His film Praktan, bagged multiple National Awards and Alik Sukh was premiered at the Marche du Film section in Cannes Film Festival in 2013. His film Konttho was selected as the Indian entry for the Best International Feature Film at the 92nd Academy Awards.

Early life and education 
Shiboprosad Mukherjee was born on 20 May 1974 at Baranagar in the northern fringes Kolkata, West Bengal, India. He was a student of Baranagore Ramakrishna Mission Ashrama High School and later completed his high school from Hindu School. He pursued his graduation in Political Science Honours from Jadavpur University.

Personal life
He married journalist Zinia Sen in 2016.

Film and television career

Acting
He joined the theatre school as a trainer after completing his schooling. He participated in the T.I. E Project (Theatre in Education), while being under the guidance of eminent theatre personality Rudraprasad Sengupta and also attended a workshop conducted by Ibrahim Alkazi. He was also guided by Rituporno Ghosh when he was working as a freelance journalist in Anandalok (a film Magazine of ABP Group), during his acting days. He debuted in the year 1995 he starred in Zee Bangla, with 'Ekushe Pa', directed by Raja Dasgupta. Later he went on to work in other daily television Serials like Janmabhoomi, Ghoom Nei, etc.

Television
Although as a director and producer he has worked with all the leading channels in West Bengal and Bangladesh and has designed television programmes of duration not less than 10,000 hours, he has been a long term associated with ETV Bangla from its inception. From 1999 to 2002, he was a senior programming associate at ETV Bangla and currently, he is behind conceptualising, designing & producing 6 hours of original programming daily.  With the credit of more than 50 non-fiction shows for Bengali television completely, designed by him, he has also conceptualised the first Bengali women's magazine programmes on television – Sreemoti. He often considered the first to launch Reality Show in Bengali television – Ritur Mela Jhoom Tara Ra Ra. But in reality Black Magic Motion Pictures led by Arjun Gourisaria created the first reality show in Bengali television Rojgere Ginni(conceptualized by Rangan Chakraborty).  
He started his own production company named "Windows Productions", along with his partner Nandita Roy, and together they have produced many non-fiction and fiction programmes.

Production

Filmography

Awards
 Anandalok Award 2012 – Best Film for film Muktodhara
 Filmfare Award (East) 2014 – Best Direction for the film Alik Sukh
 Zee Cine Award 2016 – Best film Bela Seshe
 Sera Bangali – ABP Ananda 2016 – Direction
 Mahanayak Samman Awards-2016 – for contribution to films from the West Bengal Government  
 International Bengali film awards 2016 NABC – Best film Bela Seshe
 EbelaAjeyoSamman −2016
 West Bengal Film Journalist Awards 2017 – Most Popular film  Praktan
 International Business Film Award 2016  – Highest Grossing Bengali Film    Praktan

Achievements
 Icche did a theatrical run for 125 days. The National Film Archive of India accepted Icche as part of their collection for cultural and educational purposes. Icche was screened followed by an interactive session with the participants of the 8th batch of the 21-Day Certificate Course on Legal and Psychological Counseling for Women in Distress, University of Calcutta (29 January 2013). Icche has been included in the BEd curriculum of Visva-Bharati University. PVR Cinemas selected the film to be screened at Kolkata, Delhi & Mumbai as part of the Indian Panorama Film Festival.
 Hello Memsaheb, a comedy film, achieved commercial success.
 Accident was a thought-provoking and hard-hitting feature film. It was critically acclaimed. Accident was selected for the Indian Cinema Now Section of the 18th International Kerala Film Festival 2013. It ran in theatres successfully for 50 days.
 Muktodhara was the first Bengali film in a decade to be screened at the Rashtrapati Bhavan for the President of India, Mr. Pranab Mukherjee. He was all praise for the film. Muktodhara was also watched by the governor of West Bengal Sri. M.K Narayan. Muktodhara was accepted by Legal Aid Services of West Bengal as part of their curriculum for Post Graduate Studies in Counseling, 2013 (affiliated to University of Calcutta) and also has been included in the Certificate Course on Legal and Psychological Counseling for Women in Distress. It has been included in the BEd curriculum of Visva-Bharati University. It ran in theatres successfully for 75 days. 
 Alik Sukh was premiered at the Marche du Film section in Cannes Film Festival in 2013. It had a pan India release in 2013. It was not only critically acclaimed but also did well commercially. It ran in theatres successfully for 50 days. The director duo received the Filmfare Award (East) 2014 for Best Direction for the film Alik Sukh.
 Ramdhanu achieved both commercial success and critical acclaim. It has been included in the BEd curriculum of Visva-Bharati University.
 Bela Seshe received a tremendous response and Eros International released the film in Mumbai, Delhi, Noida, Ahmedabad, Hyderabad, Gurgaon, Pune and Bangalore. It became the longest running Bengali film of the last decade. 217 days of Multiplex run and 250 days theatrical run. The film was liked by veteran actors like Amitabh Bachchan, Waheeda Rehman, Asha Parekh.
 Praktan went on become the Highest Grossing Bengali Film of 2016 and received an award at the Indian Business Film Awards 2016 along with films like Kabali, Sultan, Visaranayi etc. Praktan received as many as 8 awards at the West Bengal Film Journalist Awards 2016 including the Most Popular Film, Best Actor (Female), Best Actor in a Supporting Role (Female), Best Production Design, Best Music Album among others. The film had as many as 11 nominations at the 2nd Jio Filmfare Awards 2017 (East) and won 5 awards including Best Actor in a Supporting Role (Female) and Best Music Album among others.
 Konttho was selected as the Indian entry for the Best International Feature Film at the 92nd Academy Awards.

References

External links

 
 Shiboprosad Mukherjee on Facebook
 Shiboprosad Mukherjee on Twitter
 
 Windows Production House

 
Bengali Hindus
21st-century Indian film directors
Film directors from Kolkata
Bengali film directors
Indian male screenwriters
Jadavpur University alumni
Screenwriters from Kolkata
Male actors from Kolkata
Indian male film actors
Male actors in Bengali cinema
Male actors in Hindi cinema
20th-century Indian male actors
Ramakrishna Mission schools alumni
People from Baranagar
Baranagore Ramakrishna Mission Ashrama High School alumni
1974 births
Living people